Squalicorax, commonly known as the crow shark, is a genus of extinct lamniform shark known to have lived during the Cretaceous period. The genus had a global distribution in the Late Cretaceous epoch. Multiple species within this genus are considered to be wastebasket taxon due to morphological similarities in the teeth.

Etymology
The name Squalicorax is derived from the Latin squalus for shark and the Greek κόραξ, "korax" for raven.

Description

Their bodies were similar to the modern gray reef sharks, but the shape of the teeth is strikingly similar to that of a tiger shark. The teeth are numerous, relatively small, with a curved crown and serrated, up to 2.5 – 3 cm in height. Large numbers of fossil teeth have been found in Europe, North Africa, and North America. Squalicorax is one of three Cretaceous lamniformes to garner serrations along with Pseudocorax and Galeocorax. 

Squalicorax was a coastal predator, but also scavenged as evidenced by a Squalicorax tooth found embedded in the metatarsal (foot) bone of a terrestrial hadrosaurid dinosaur that most likely died on land and ended up in the water. Other food sources included turtles, mosasaurs, ichthyodectids, and other bony fishes and sea creatures. Tooth marks from this shark have also been found on the bones of Pteranodon, but whether the shark actively snatched such large pterosaurs out of the air, attacked them as they dove after prey, or was simply scavenging is not known.

Description of selected species

 

The following are the best studied American species for which relatively complete skeletons are described:
 Squalicorax falcatus (Agassiz, 1843) – is a medium-sized shark with a broad snout and relatively small teeth. Its length reached almost 3 m. It lived during the Cenomanian to early Santonian (Campanian). Complete skeletons are known from sediments of the Western Inland Sea of the Cretaceous in Kansas, South Dakota, and Wyoming, all in the USA. The teeth are also found in France, the Czech Republic, Canada, and Morocco. Given the small teeth, this species is considered a hunter of small prey. However, teeth marks on the bones of marine reptiles are evidence that these shark also fed on carrion. The body shape and structure of the trunk placoid scales indicate the ability to swim quickly. A fully articulated 1.9-m long fossil skeleton of Squalicorax falcatus has been found in Kansas, evidence of its presence in the Western Interior Seaway.
 Squalicorax kaupi (Agassiz, 1843) is from the late Santonian to the late Maastrichtian of North America, New Zealand, Japan, Africa, Europe, Kazakhstan, Jordan. and other places. It was slightly larger than the preceding species, of which it was probably an ancestor.
 Squalicorax pristodontus (Agassiz, 1843) is the largest species, exceeding  in length. It lived during the late Campanian to early Maastrichtian of North America, France, the Netherlands, Egypt, Morocco, and Madagascar. The relatively complete remains (vertebrae and fragments of jaws) have been found in marine sediments in North America. It is the species with the largest teeth, these teeth being loosely spaced and relatively very large in comparison with other species. In this genus of sharks, studies have shown no precise correlation between the size of the teeth and the length of the body. They could eat relatively large prey and carrion.
 Squalicorax volgensis - the oldest species of the genus, from the Early Cretaceous of the Volga – has been described by L. Glickman et al. in 1971. The teeth of this species had virtually no serration. They are known from the Albian to the Turonian Age in Eastern and Western Europe, as well as Texas.

The world's largest and most complete semiarticulated fossil of Squalicorax was  found in 2014 in stores of the Canadian Fossil Discovery Centre in Morden, Manitoba, in Canada, where it is now displayed. It measures more than 3 m in length.

References

Sources
 H. Cappetta, Handbook of Paleoichthyology (Gustav Fischer, 1987)

External links
 Elasmo.com page on Squalicorax
 Cretoxyrhina mantelli - The Ginsu Shark and Squalicorax falcatus - The Crow Shark
 Squalicorax beim ReefQuest Centre for Shark Research

Anacoracidae
Cretaceous sharks
Late Cretaceous fish of North America
Cretaceous fish of Europe
Fossil taxa described in 1939
Demopolis Chalk
Mooreville Chalk
Prehistoric shark genera